The Confederation of African Netball Associations is the regional body within the International Federation of Netball Associations that governs netball in Africa. There are currently seventeen members within the African region.

Full Members
 Botswana
 Ghana
 Kenya
 Lesotho
 Malawi
 Namibia
 South Africa
 Swaziland (now Eswatini)
 Tanzania
 Uganda
 Zambia
 Zimbabwe

Associate members
 Cameroon
 Ethiopia
 Nigeria
 Seychelles
 Sierra Leone
 USA

References

  
Africa
Netball